Superstore is an American comedy television series created by Justin Spitzer, which premiered on NBC on November 30, 2015. The series stars America Ferrera, Ben Feldman, Lauren Ash, Colton Dunn, Nico Santos, Nichole Sakura, Kaliko Kauahi, and Mark McKinney as a group of employees working at a fictional big-box store called "Cloud 9" set in St. Louis, Missouri. On February 11, 2020, the series was renewed for a 15-episode sixth season, which premiered on October 29, 2020. In December 2020, NBC announced that the sixth season would serve as the final season.

Series overview

Episodes

Season 1 (2015–16)

Season 2 (2016–17)

Season 3 (2017–18)

Season 4 (2018–19)

Season 5 (2019–20)

Season 6 (2020–21)

Ratings

References

External links
 
 
 

Superstore
Episodes